Kanpur Airport, proposed to be renamed as Ganesh Shankar Vidyarthi Airport, is a domestic airport and an Indian Air Force Base that serves the city of Kanpur, Uttar Pradesh, India. It provides easier connectivity to major tourist and historical attractions in the area such as Bithoor, Sankissa, Etawah Safari Park, Kalinjar Fort, Kalpi, National Chambal Sanctuary, Bhitargaon and Kannauj. It is the 5th most profitable airport in India in the year 2020–21.

History 
Kanpur airport was officially a military airport titled for the use of The Indian Air Force which is why it is still denoted as Chakeri Air Force Station. This airport started operating commercial flights only in the year 1970. It started functioning as a regular domestic airport in 2004 and now serves almost all major cities in the country.

New Terminal

Due to the limited expansion options available and restrictions enforced by the Airports Authority of India, the current terminal is not able to cope with the large air traffic demands coming into Kanpur. A new terminal of 6,000 sq meters is under construction on Kanpur— Prayagraj National Highway.

The new terminal will consist of 6 hangars and a waiting room for 300 passengers, 8 check-in desks as well as a high-traffic connection to the nearby highway. It will be energy efficient and will be completed by March 2023.

Airlines and destinations

References

External links 

Kanpur Airport at AAI

World War II sites in India
Indian Air Force bases
Airports in Kanpur
Airports in Uttar Pradesh